André Le Nôtre (12 March 1613 – 15 September 1700), originally rendered as André Le Nostre, was a French landscape architect and the principal gardener of King Louis XIV of France. He was the landscape architect who designed the gardens of the Palace of Versailles; his work represents the height of the French formal garden style, or jardin à la française.

Prior to working on Versailles, Le Nôtre collaborated with Louis Le Vau and Charles Le Brun on the park at Vaux-le-Vicomte. His other works include the design of gardens and parks at Chantilly, Fontainebleau, Saint-Cloud and Saint-Germain. His contribution to planning was also significant: at the Tuileries he extended the westward vista, which later became the avenue of the Champs-Élysées and comprise the Axe historique.

Biography

Early life
André Le Nôtre was born in Paris, into a family of gardeners. Pierre Le Nôtre, who was in charge of the gardens of the Palais des Tuileries in 1572, may have been his grandfather. André's father Jean Le Nôtre was also responsible for sections of the Tuileries gardens, initially under Claude Mollet, and later as head gardener, during the reign of Louis XIII. André was born on 12 March 1613, and was baptised at the Église Saint-Roch. His godfather at the ceremony was an administrator of the royal gardens, and his godmother was the wife of Claude Mollet.

The family lived in a house within the Tuilieries, and André thus grew up surrounded by gardening, and quickly acquired both practical and theoretical knowledge. The location also allowed him to study in the nearby Palais du Louvre, part of which was then used as an academy of the arts. He learned mathematics, painting and architecture, and entered the atelier of Simon Vouet, painter to Louis XIII, where he met and befriended the painter Charles Le Brun. He learned classical art and perspective, and studied for several years under the architect François Mansart, a friend of Le Brun.

Career

In 1635, Le Nôtre was named the principal gardener of the king's brother Gaston, duc d'Orléans. On 26 June 1637, Le Nôtre was appointed head gardener at the Tuileries, taking over his father's position. He had primary responsibility for the areas of the garden closest to the palace, including the orangery built by Simon Bouchard. In 1643 he was appointed "draughtsman of plants and terraces" for Anne of Austria, the queen mother, and from 1645 to 1646 he worked on the modernisation of the gardens of the Château de Fontainebleau.

He was later put in charge of all the royal gardens of France, and in 1657 he was further appointed Controller-General of the Royal Buildings. There are few direct references to Le Nôtre in the royal accounts, and Le Nôtre himself seldom wrote down his ideas or approach to gardening. He expressed himself purely through his gardens. He became a trusted advisor to Louis XIV, and in 1675 he was ennobled by the King. He and Le Brun even accompanied the court at the siege of Cambrai in 1677.

In 1640, he married Françoise Langlois. They had three children, although none survived to adulthood.

Vaux-le-Vicomte

André Le Nôtre's first major garden design was undertaken for Nicolas Fouquet, Louis XIV's Superintendent of Finances. Fouquet began work on the Château de Vaux-le-Vicomte in 1657, employing the architect Louis Le Vau, the painter Charles Le Brun, and Le Nôtre. The three designers worked in partnership, with Le Nôtre laying out a grand, symmetrical arrangement of parterres, pools and gravel walks. Le Vau and Le Nôtre exploited the changing levels across the site, so that the canal is invisible from the house, and employed forced perspective to make the grotto appear closer than it really is. The gardens were complete by 1661, when Fouquet held a grand entertainment for the king. But only three weeks later, on 10 September 1661, Fouquet was arrested for embezzling state funds, and his artists and craftsmen were taken into the king's service.

Versailles

From 1661, Le Nôtre was working for Louis XIV to build and enhance the garden and parks of the Château de Versailles. Louis extended the existing hunting lodge, eventually making it his primary residence and seat of power. Le Nôtre also laid out the radiating city plan of Versailles, which included the largest avenue yet seen in Europe, the Avenue de Paris.

In the following century, the Versailles design influenced Pierre Charles L'Enfant's master plan for Washington, D.C. See, L'Enfant Plan.

Other gardens

France
In 1661, Le Nôtre was also working on the gardens at the Palace of Fontainebleau. In 1663 he was engaged at Château de Saint-Germain-en-Laye, and Château de Saint-Cloud, residence of Philippe d'Orléans, where he would oversee works for many years. Also from 1663, Le Nôtre was engaged at Château de Chantilly, property of the Prince de Condé, where he worked with his brother-in-law Pierre Desgots until the 1680s. From 1664 he was rebuilding the gardens of the Tuileries, at the behest of Colbert, Louis's chief minister, who still hoped the king would remain in Paris. In 1667 Le Nôtre extended the main axis of the gardens westward, creating the avenue which would become the Champs-Élysées. Colbert commissioned Le Nôtre in 1670, to alter the gardens of his own château de Sceaux, which was ongoing until 1683.

Abroad
In 1662, he provided designs for Greenwich Park in London, for Charles II of England. In 1670 Le Nôtre conceived a project for the Castle of Racconigi in Italy, and between 1674 and 1698 he remodelled the gardens of Venaria Reale, near Turin. In 1679, he visited Italy. His later advice was provided for Charlottenburg Palace and château de Cassel in Germany, and with plans for Windsor Castle.

Final works
Between 1679 and 1682, he was involved in the planning of the gardens of Château de Meudon for François-Michel le Tellier, Marquis de Louvois, and in 1691 redid the garden of the Hôtel de Saint-Aignan in Paris.

His work has often been favorably compared and contrasted ("the antithesis") to the œuvre of Lancelot "Capability" Brown, the English landscape architect.

List of principal gardens by Le Nôtre

 Gardens of Versailles, city plan of Versailles
 Gardens of Vaux-le-Vicomte
 Gardens of Château de Saint-Germain-en-Laye
 Gardens of Château de Saint-Cloud (the château no longer stands but the gardens still exist)
 Gardens of Palais des Tuileries
 Gardens of Château de Sceaux
 Gardens of Château de Fontainebleau
 Gardens of Château de Chantilly
 Gardens of Château de Bercy (demolished), Charenton-le-Pont
 Gardens of Château de Braine (demolished, Braine, (Aisne)
 Gardens of 
 Gardens of Château d'Issy (demolished)
 Gardens of Château de Chenailles

In popular culture
André Le Nôtre was played by Matthias Schoenaerts in the 2014 film A Little Chaos.

See also
 17th-century French art
 Baroque architecture
 French garden design history:
 Gardens of the French Renaissance
 French formal garden
 French landscape garden

References

Sources
 Gady, Alexandre (2008). Les Hôtels particuliers de Paris du Moyen Âge à la Belle Époque. Paris: Parigramme. .
 
 
 Hazlehurst, F. Hamilton (1980). Gardens of Illusion: The Genius of André Le Nostre. Nashville, Tennessee: Vanderbilt University Press. .
 Hazlehurst, F. Hamilton (1996). "Le Nôtre , André", vol. 19, pp. 162–164, in The Dictionary of Art, edited by Jane Turner. London: Macmillan.

Citations

Further reading
 Thompson, Ian. The Sun King's Garden: Louis XIV, André Le Nôtre And the Creation of the Gardens of Versailles. London: Bloomsbury Publishing, 2006 (hardcover).
 Reviewed by Peter Parker in the Telegraph, 1 October 2006.
 Reviewed by John Adamson in the Telegraph, 2006.

External links

 André Le Nôtre, website of the Ministry of Culture and of Communication (in French and English)
 André Le Nôtre, biography from gardenvisit.com, landscape architecture and garden guide
 André le Nôtre, French biography, pictures and video
 André Le Notre, le jardinier du roi, notice for a 2014 French television documentary about the life of André le Nôtre, directed by Jacques Vichet

1613 births
1700 deaths
Artists from Paris
Burials at Saint-Roch, Paris
French Baroque garden designers
French Roman Catholics
Members of the Académie royale d'architecture
Architects from Versailles